Belushya Guba (lit. beluga whale bay), also Belushye, is a work settlement and the administrative center of Novaya Zemlya District of Arkhangelsk Oblast, Russia, located on the Gusinaya Zemlya peninsula of the Yuzhny Island of the Novaya Zemlya arctic archipelago. Its population was reported as  a decline of more than 20% from  It is the largest settlement on the island.

It is the main permanent settlement of the island territory of Novaya Zemlya. A large proportion of its population is made up of military personnel associated with the nuclear test sites located on the island.

The whole Novaya Zemlya archipelago, including Belushya Guba, is an area of restricted access (formally, as part of border security zone), and a special permit is needed to visit the archipelago.

History
Upon visiting Novaya Zemlya in 1894, Arkhangelsk Governor  decided to create a new encampment. In 1896, an expedition conducted a survey of the west coast of Novaya Zemlya. The following year Belushya Guba was founded.

During World War II, Belushya Guba was a focus of both German and Soviet attention. German U-boats used Belushya Bay as a resting area in 1941. The German military contemplated establishing a weather station or other land-based facilities nearby, but increasing Soviet military presence in the area prevented that. On July 27, 1942,  shelled Malye Karmakuly near Belushia Bay, damaging seaplanes, living huts, and storage huts. U-601 torpedoed and sank the Soviet merchant ship Krestianin, carrying coal, as it neared Belushya Guba.  On August 19,  tried to enter Belushya Guba, but was detected and attacked by a motor boat and two Soviet minesweepers. U-209 departed when a Soviet coast guard ship and icebreaker SKR-18 (formerly Fedor Litke) approached from Belushuya Guba. Belushya Guba was used as an anchorage by Russian convoys between the Barents Sea and Archangelsk. A Soviet naval base was established in Belushya Guba in 1944.

The settlement started to flourish in 1954, when Novaya Zemlya became established as a nuclear test site. In 1956, the whole indigenous population of Novaya Zemlya, mostly Nenets, were evicted from the islands and then resettled.

Geography and climate

Belushya Guba is located on a deep bay with the same name, within a geographical area that is influenced by warm ocean currents. The natural conditions allow year-round sailing of all types and classes of vessels with minimal cost for icebreaking support. The bay is well protected from high surf and drifting ice.

The area of the southern island of Novaya Zemlya experiences from eight to ten cyclones per month during the winter, with the main direction of the cyclone trajectories from the west and south-west to north-east. The "midnight sun" is above the horizon from 10 May to 3 August (86 days), and the period of continuous night is slightly shorter at 66 days. The polar night runs from 19 November to 23 January.

Economy
Belushya Guba has schools, apartment buildings, three hotels, a cashpoint ATM, a television station, a 200-bed Naval Hospital, a polyclinic, military officers' center with a base sailor's club, 25-meter pool, recreational center, and an Orthodox church.

Transportation
There is no regular passenger navigation.

References

Urban-type settlements in Arkhangelsk Oblast
Novaya Zemlya
Populated places of Arctic Russia
Populated places established in 1897
1897 establishments in the Russian Empire